The 2012 WNBA season is the 13th season for the Indiana Fever of the Women's National Basketball Association.

Transactions

WNBA Draft
The following are the Fever's selections in the 2012 WNBA Draft.

Transaction log
April 11, 2011: The Fever acquired a third-round pick in the 2012 Draft from the Seattle Storm as part of the Katie Smith transaction. The Fever sent a second-round pick to Seattle as part of the trade.
February 3: The Fever re-signed Erin Phillips.
February 8: The Fever re-signed Tamika Catchings.
February 14: The Fever re-signed Shyra Ely.
March 1: The Fever traded Tangela Smith to the San Antonio Silver Stars in exchange for Roneeka Hodges.
March 14: The Fever signed Jenna Smith and Erlana Larkins.
March 16: The Fever re-signed Shannon Bobbitt.
April 24: The Fever signed La'Tangela Atkinson, and draft picks Sasha Goodlett and Courtney Hurt.
May 3: The Fever waived Courtney Hurt and Jenna Smith.
May 11: The Fever waived Shyra Ely and La'Tangela Atkinson.
May 14: The Fever waived Shannon Bobbitt.
July 2: The Fever traded Roneeka Hodges to the Tulsa Shock in exchange for Karima Christmas.

Trades

Personnel changes

Additions

Subtractions

Roster
Source

Depth

Season standings

Schedule

Preseason

|- align="center" bgcolor="bbffbb"
| 1 || Sat 5 || 8:00 || @ San Antonio ||  || 69-67 || Hodges (16) || Larkins (7) || AtkinsonJanuaryZellous (3) || Trinity University  N/A || 1-0
|- align="center" bgcolor="bbffbb"
| 2 || Wed 9 || 12:00 || San Antonio ||  || 78-69 || Hodges (10) || Davenport (5) || BobbittCatchings (4) || Bankers Life Fieldhouse  5,270 || 2-0
|-

Regular season

|- align="center" bgcolor="bbffbb"
| 1 || Sat 19 || 7:00 || Atlanta || FS-ISSO || 92-84 || Douglas (21) || Davenport (10) || CatchingsDouglasJanuaryPhillips (3) || Bankers Life Fieldhouse  9,403 || 1-0
|- align="center" bgcolor="bbffbb"
| 2 || Fri 25 || 8:30 || @ Chicago || CN100 || 83-72 || Catchings (22) || Zellous (7) || Catchings (5) || Allstate Arena  6,198 || 2-0
|- align="center" bgcolor="bbffbb"
| 3 || Sun 27 || 3:00 || @ Atlanta || SSO || 78-62 || Catchings (25) || Catchings (12) || January (5) || Philips Arena  7,282 || 3-0
|-

|- align="center" bgcolor="bbffbb"
| 4 || Sat 2 || 7:00 || New York || FS-I || 91-68 || Catchings (16) || Goodlett (6) || January (5) || Bankers Life Fieldhouse  8,006 || 4-0
|- align="center" bgcolor="ffbbbb"
| 5 || Sun 3 || 6:00 || @ New York || MSG || 72-87 || Catchings (19) || CatchingsJanuary (6) || Zellous (4) || Prudential Center  4,905 || 4-1
|- align="center" bgcolor="ffbbbb"
| 6 || Fri 8 || 7:00 || Connecticut ||  || 81-89 || Catchings (31) || CatchingsSutton-Brown (8) || January (6) || Bankers Life Fieldhouse  6,041 || 4-2
|- align="center" bgcolor="ffbbbb"
| 7 || Fri 15 || 7:00 || @ Washington || CSN-MA || 66-67 || Catchings (15) || Catchings (9) || DouglasJanuary (4) || Verizon Center  8,050 || 4-3
|- align="center" bgcolor="bbffbb"
| 8 || Sat 16 || 7:00 || Chicago || CN100 || 84-70 || Davenport (19) || Catchings (7) || Douglas (8) || Bankers Life Fieldhouse  6,098 || 5-3
|- align="center" bgcolor="ffbbbb"
| 9 || Tue 19 || 7:00 || @ Connecticut || CPTV-S || 85-88(OT) || Douglas (23) || Douglas (9) || Catchings (5) || Mohegan Sun Arena  6,503 || 5-4
|- align="center" bgcolor="bbffbb"
| 10 || Thu 21 || 7:00 || Connecticut || FS-ICPTV-S || 95-61 || January (20) || Catchings (10) || Catchings (8) || Bankers Life Fieldhouse  6,326 || 6-4
|- align="center" bgcolor="bbffbb"
| 11 || Sat 23 || 8:00 || @ Tulsa ||  || 73-70 || Catchings (16) || Catchings (8) || CatchingsDouglasJanuary (4) || BOK Center  4,209 || 7-4
|- align="center" bgcolor="ffbbbb"
| 12 || Tue 26 || 12:00 || @ Atlanta || SSO || 58-70 || CatchingsDavenportDouglas (8) || Larkins (7) || January (6) || Philips Arena  8,388 || 7-5
|- align="center" bgcolor="bbffbb"
| 13 || Wed 27 || 12:30 || @ Chicago ||  || 81-72 || Zellous (18) || Sutton-Brown (8) || Catchings (9) || Allstate Arena  6,312 || 8-5
|-

|- align="center" bgcolor="ffbbbb"
| 14 || Thu 5 || 7:00 || San Antonio || NBATV || 72-88 || Douglas (19) || Catchings (15) || CatchingsDouglas (4) || Bankers Life Fieldhouse  6,088 || 8-6
|- align="center" bgcolor="bbffbb"
| 15 || Sat 7 || 7:00 || Chicago || CN100 || 88-86(OT) || Catchings (18) || Catchings (9) || Catchings (6) || Bankers Life Fieldhouse  6,155 || 9-6
|- align="center" bgcolor="bbffbb"
| 16 || Tue 10 || 12:00 || New York ||  || 84-82 || Catchings (23) || Douglas (7) || January (4) || Bankers Life Fieldhouse  9,216 || 10-6
|- align="center" bgcolor="ffbbbb"
| 17 || Thu 12 || 7:00 || Los Angeles || ESPN2 || 74-77 || Catchings (27) || CatchingsLarkins (6) || January (4) || Bankers Life Fieldhouse  7,244 || 10-7
|-
| colspan="11" align="center" valign="middle" | Summer Olympic break
|-

|-
| colspan="11" align="center" valign="middle" | Summer Olympic break
|- align="center" bgcolor="bbffbb"
| 18 || Thu 16 || 7:00 || Washington || NBATV || 84-66 || Larkins (16) || Catchings (14) || Zellous (5) || Bankers Life Fieldhouse  6,834 || 11-7
|- align="center" bgcolor="bbffbb"
| 19 || Sat 18 || 7:00 || Atlanta || NBATVFS-ISSO || 86-72 || Douglas (29) || Catchings (9) || CatchingsJanuary (5) || Bankers Life Fieldhouse  9,302 || 12-7
|- align="center" bgcolor="ffbbbb"
| 20 || Tue 21 || 10:30 || @ Los Angeles || TWC101 || 69-79 || Douglas (22) || Larkins (8) || Catchings (3) || Staples Center  8,402 || 12-8
|- align="center" bgcolor="bbffbb"
| 21 || Thu 23 || 10:00 || @ Seattle ||  || 68-66 || Catchings (18) || Catchings (11) || January (4) || KeyArena  5,819 || 13-8
|- align="center" bgcolor="bbffbb"
| 22 || Sat 25 || 10:00 || @ Phoenix ||  || 85-72 || January (22) || DouglasPhillipsDavenport (6) || Catchings (6) || US Airways Center  9,079 || 14-8
|- align="center" bgcolor="bbffbb"
| 23 || Tue 28 || 7:00 || Washington ||  || 83-68 || Douglas (18) || CatchingsDavenport (5) || Catchings (5) || Bankers Life Fieldhouse  6,525 || 15-8
|- align="center" bgcolor="bbffbb"
| 24 || Thu 30 || 7:00 || @ New York || NBATVMSG || 76-63 || Catchings (22) || Catchings (5) || January (8) || Prudential Center  5,315 || 16-8
|-

|- align="center" bgcolor="bbffbb"
| 25 || Sat 1 || 7:00 || Chicago || NBATVCN100 || 81-64 || January (19) || Catchings (10) || January (4) || Bankers Life Fieldhouse  9,307 || 17-8
|- align="center" bgcolor="ffbbbb"
| 26 || Wed 5 || 7:00 || @ Atlanta || NBATVFS-IFS-S || 64-71 || Douglas (23) || Catchings (9) || January (5) || Philips Arena  4,112 || 17-9
|- align="center" bgcolor="bbffbb"
| 27 || Fri 7 || 8:00 || @ San Antonio ||  || 82-78 || Catchings (26) || Catchings (11) || January (6) || AT&T Center  8,097 || 18-9
|- align="center" bgcolor="bbffbb"
| 28 || Sun 9 || 6:00 || Phoenix || NBATVFS-I || 89-83 || Douglas (30) || CatchingsLarkins (5) || January (5) || Bankers Life Fieldhouse  7,971 || 19-9
|- align="center" bgcolor="bbffbb"
| 29 || Wed 12 || 7:00 || Seattle || NBATV || 72-48 || Douglas (16) || CatchingsLarkins (7) || Larkins (4) || Bankers Life Fieldhouse  6,337 || 20-9
|- align="center" bgcolor="ffbbbb"
| 30 || Fri 14 || 7:00 || Minnesota ||  || 64-66 || January (16) || Catchings (12) || January (4) || Bankers Life Fieldhouse  8,819 || 20-10
|- align="center" bgcolor="ffbbbb"
| 31 || Sun 17 || 8:00 || @ Minnesota || NBATVFS-I || 79-86 || Catchings (19) || Catchings (10) || JanuaryPhillips (5) || Target Center  9,523 || 20-11
|- align="center" bgcolor="ffbbbb"
| 32 || Wed 19 || 7:00 || @ Connecticut ||  || 67-73 || Douglas (19) || Christmas (6) || CatchingsChristmas (3) || Mohegan Sun Arena  5,811 || 20-12
|- align="center" bgcolor="bbffbb"
| 33 || Fri 21 || 7:00 || @ Washington || NBATV || 66-53 || Phillips (19) || Larkins (11) || Catchings (4) || Verizon Center  7,702 || 21-12
|- align="center" bgcolor="bbffbb"
| 34 || Sun 23 || 5:00 || Tulsa || NBATVFS-I || 91-58 || Phillips (21) || Catchings (10) || LarkinsSutton-BrownChristmas (3) || Bankers Life Fieldhouse  9,225 || 22-12
|-

| All games are viewable on WNBA LiveAccess or ESPN3.com

Postseason

|- align="center" bgcolor="ffbbbb"
| 1 || September 28 || 7:00 || Atlanta || ESPN2 || 66-75 || Douglas (13) || Catchings (11) || CatchingsJanuary (3) || Bankers Life Fieldhouse  7,776 || 0-1
|- align="center" bgcolor="bbffbb"
| 2 || September 30 || 4:00 || @ Atlanta || ESPN || 103-88 || Catchings (25) || Catchings (13) || January (7) || Philips Arena  6,890 || 1-1
|- align="center" bgcolor="bbffbb"
| 3 || October 2 || 7:00 || Atlanta || NBATV || 75-64 || Douglas (24) || Larkins (20) || January (5) || Bankers Life Fieldhouse  6,840 || 2-1
|-

|- align="center" bgcolor="ffbbbb"
| 1 || October 5 || 8:00 || @ Connecticut || ESPN2 || 64-76 || Douglas (27) || Catchings (9) || Catchings (5) || Mohegan Sun Arena  7,599 || 0-1
|- align="center" bgcolor="bbffbb"
| 2 || October 8 || 8:00 || Connecticut || ESPN2  || 78-76 || Douglas (24) || Larkins (11) || DouglasJanuary (2) || Bankers Life Fieldhouse  9,225 || 1-1
|- align="center" bgcolor="bbffbb"
| 3 || October 11 || 8:30 || @ Connecticut || ESPN2 || 87-71 || Catchings (22) || Catchings (13) || CatchingsJanuary (4) || Mohegan Sun Arena  6,516 || 2-1
|-

|- align="center" bgcolor="bbffbb"
| 1 || October 14 || 8:00 || @ Minnesota || ESPN2 || 76-70 || Catchings (20) || Larkins (15) || January (6) || Target Center  14,322|| 1-0
|- align="center" bgcolor="ffbbbb"
| 2 || October 17 || 8:00 || @ Minnesota || ESPN || 71-83 || Catchings (27) || Catchings (8) || Phillips (4) || Target Center  13,478 || 1-1
|- align="center" bgcolor="bbffbb"
| 3 || October 19 || 8:00 || Minnesota || ESPN2 || 76-59 || Zellous (30) || Larkins (15) || Davenport (4) || Bankers Life Fieldhouse  18,165 || 2-1
|- align="center" bgcolor="bbffbb"
| 4 || October 21 || 8:00 || Minnesota || ESPN2 || 87-78 || Catchings (25) || Larkins (13) || Catchings (8) || Bankers Life Fieldhouse  15,213 || 3-1
|-

Statistics

Regular season

Awards and honors

References

Indiana
Indiana Fever seasons
Women's National Basketball Association championship seasons
Eastern Conference (WNBA) championship seasons
Indiana Fever